Alhassane Dante Issoufou (born January 1, 1981) is a Nigerien footballer who plays as a striker.

Career
Before signed with Morrocain club played for ASO Chlef and formerly presented Zumunta AC, Africa Sports, CA Bordj Bou Arreridj, JS du Ténéré, KSC Lokeren and RC Kadiogo.

International career

Issoufou is the member of Niger national football team. He played on 2012 Africa Cup of Nations. As there was no accurate statistic made, Issoufou's caps and number of goals for national team remain mystery, but it seems that he played more than 30 matches and scored at least 3 goals.

Honours
 Won the CAF Confederation Cup once with FUS de Rabat in 2010

References

External links

1981 births
Living people
Nigerien footballers
Niger international footballers
Rail Club du Kadiogo players
Expatriate footballers in Algeria
Association football forwards
Expatriate footballers in Burkina Faso
Expatriate footballers in Ivory Coast
Fath Union Sport players
Expatriate footballers in Morocco
Nigerien expatriate sportspeople in Burkina Faso
Nigerien expatriate sportspeople in Algeria
CA Bordj Bou Arréridj players
ASO Chlef players
2012 Africa Cup of Nations players
2013 Africa Cup of Nations players
K.S.C. Lokeren Oost-Vlaanderen players
Africa Sports d'Abidjan players
Raja CA players
Nigerien expatriate sportspeople in Ivory Coast
People from Niamey
Ittihad Khemisset players
Nigerien expatriate sportspeople in Morocco